Sathon is a genus of braconid wasps in the family Braconidae. There are more than 20 described species in Sathon, found throughout the world.

Species
These 23 species belong to the genus Sathon:

 Sathon aggeris Williams, 1988
 Sathon albicoxus Austin & Dangerfield, 1992
 Sathon bekilyensis (Granger, 1949)
 Sathon belippae (Rohwer, 1919)
 Sathon cinctiformis (Viereck, 1911)
 Sathon circumflexus Williams, 1988
 Sathon eugeni (Papp, 1972)
 Sathon falcatus (Nees, 1834)
 Sathon fausta (Nixon, 1973)
 Sathon flavofacialis (Granger, 1949)
 Sathon laevidorsum Williams, 1988
 Sathon lateralis (Haliday, 1834)
 Sathon laurae (de Saeger, 1944)
 Sathon masoni Williams, 1988
 Sathon mikeno (de Saeger, 1944)
 Sathon morata (Wilkinson, 1929)
 Sathon naryciae Austin & Dangerfield, 1992
 Sathon neomexicanus (Muesebeck, 1921)
 Sathon oreo Fagan-Jeffries & Austin, 2019
 Sathon papilionae Williams, 1988
 Sathon resplendens (Wilkinson, 1929)
 Sathon ruandanus (de Saeger, 1944)
 Sathon rufotestaceus (Granger, 1949)

References

Further reading

 
 
 

Microgastrinae
Braconidae genera